Tetrazygia elegans is a species of plant in the family Melastomataceae. It is endemic to Cuba.

References

Flora of Cuba
elegans
Vulnerable plants
Taxonomy articles created by Polbot